Česlav Okinčic (Polish: Czesław Okińczyc; born 13 September 1955) is a Polish-Lithuanian politician, born in Vilnius.  In 1990 he was among those who signed the Act of the Re-Establishment of the State of Lithuania.

References
 Biography

1955 births
Living people
Members of the Seimas
Lithuanian people of Polish descent
Soviet people of Polish descent
Lawyers from Vilnius
Politicians from Vilnius
Vilnius University alumni
20th-century Lithuanian lawyers
21st-century Lithuanian lawyers
Commanders of the Order of Polonia Restituta
Grand Crosses of the Order of Merit of the Republic of Poland